
Gmina Oksa is a rural gmina (administrative district) in Jędrzejów County, Świętokrzyskie Voivodeship, in south-central Poland.

Villages
Gmina Oksa contains the villages and settlements of Błogoszów, Lipno, Nowe Kanice, Oksa, Pawęzów, Popowice, Rembiechowa, Rzeszówek, Stare Kanice, Tyniec, Tyniec-Wieś, Węgleszyn, Węgleszyn-Dębina, Węgleszyn-Ogrody, Zakrzów and Zalesie.

Neighbouring gminas
Gmina Oksa is bordered by the gminas of Jędrzejów, Małogoszcz, Nagłowice, Radków and Włoszczowa.

References
Polish official population figures 2006

Oksa
Jędrzejów County